Stony River (Gidighuyghatno’ Xidochagg Qay’ in Deg Xinag, K'qizaghetnu Hdakaq’ in Dena'ina) is a census-designated place (CDP) in Bethel Census Area, Alaska, United States. The population was 54 at the 2010 census, down from 61 in 2000.

Native inhabitants are mixed Athabaskan and Yup'ik ancestry of Alaska Native. Stony River village is the modern contact point between Yu'pik Eskimo and three distinct Athabaskan peoples: Deg Hit'an, Dena'ina, and Upper Kuskokwim. Today there is considerable multilingualism in Stony River village between Yu'pik and three distinct Athabaskan languages.

Geography

Demographics

Stony River first appeared on the 1970 U.S. Census as an unincorporated village. It was made a census-designated place (CDP) in 1980.

As of the census of 2000, there were 61 people, 19 households, and 14 families residing in the CDP. The population density was 16.8 people per square mile (6.5/km2). There were 25 housing units at an average density of 6.9/sq mi (2.7/km2). The racial makeup of the CDP was 14.75% White, 78.69% Native American, and 6.56% from two or more races.

There were 19 households, out of which 52.6% had children under the age of 18 living with them, 47.4% were married couples living together, 5.3% had a female householder with no husband present, and 26.3% were non-families. 21.1% of all households were made up of individuals, and none had someone living alone who was 65 years of age or older. The average household size was 3.21 and the average family size was 3.64.

In the CDP, the population was spread out, with 39.3% under the age of 18, 13.1% from 18 to 24, 29.5% from 25 to 44, 11.5% from 45 to 64, and 6.6% who were 65 years of age or older. The median age was 24 years. For every 100 females, there were 117.9 males. For every 100 females age 18 and over, there were 131.3 males.

The median income for a household in the CDP was $20,714, and the median income for a family was $20,714. Males had a median income of $8,750 versus $0 for females. The per capita income for the CDP was $5,469. There were 38.9% of families and 38.7% of the population living below the poverty line, including 36.7% of those under 18 and none of those over 64.

See also
 Stony River Airport

References

External links
History of Stony River

Denaʼina
Census-designated places in Alaska
Census-designated places in Bethel Census Area, Alaska
Census-designated places in Unorganized Borough, Alaska
Deg Xitʼan
Yupik